Experimental Squadron or experimental squadron may refer to:
Experimental Squadron (Royal Navy), sent out in the 1830s and 1840s by the Royal Navy
No. 10 Squadron RCN, Royal Canadian Naval Air Service
Zirkus Rosarius, one of the Luftwaffe's wartime experimental and research squadrons
VFA-94 in the United States Air Force